Nicoletta Pasquale, known also as Coletta Pasquale or Paschale (Latin: Nicoletta Paschalis) was an Italian poet.

Biography
Nicoletta Pasquale was a noblewoman of Messina, a poet and intellectual. Little is known about her education and private life. She was mentioned by the historian Antonio Mongitore in his biographical work Bibliotheca Sicula, which in turn was used as a source for the work L'istoria della volgar poesia (History of vernacular poetry) by the literary critic Giovanni Mario Crescimbeni, first published in 1698.

Works
Nicoletta Pasquale left a legacy of several sonnets and a sestina. Some of her poetic contributions were published in Il sesto libro delle rime di diversi eccellenti autori and in Il Tempio alla divina signora donna Giovanna d'Aragona, both anthologies collected and edited by Girolamo Ruscelli and published in Venice in 1553 and 1555, respectively.

See also
 Devorà Ascarelli, first published Jewish female author
 Laura Battiferri
 Isotta Brembati
 Maddalena Campiglia
 Veronica Franco
 Isabella di Morra

Notes

References

External links
  (Sonnets and sestina by Nicoletta Pasquale from Ruscelli's Sesto libro delle rime, in the Anthologies of Italian Lyric Poetry curated by the University of Pavia)

16th-century Italian poets
Italian women poets
Writers from Messina
Poets from Sicily
Year of birth unknown
Year of death unknown
Date of death unknown
16th-century Italian women writers